Goniodoris ovata is a species of sea slug, a dorid nudibranch, a marine gastropod mollusc in the family Goniodorididae.

Distribution
This species was first described from South Africa.

Description

Ecology
Goniodoris ovata probably feeds on bryozoans or colonial ascidians but the diet is apparently not yet determined.

References

Goniodorididae
Gastropods described in 1934